Golda Meir is an outdoor bronze sculpture of former Israeli prime minister Golda Meir. The sculpture is located at Golda Meir Square near Broadway and 39th Street in the Garment District of Manhattan, New York. It was unveiled in 1984.  It is one of only five statues of women in New York City .

References

External links

1984 establishments in New York City
1984 sculptures
Bronze sculptures in Manhattan
Busts in New York City
Cultural depictions of Golda Meir
Monuments and memorials in Manhattan
Monuments and memorials to women
Outdoor sculptures in Manhattan
Sculptures of women in New York City
Statues of politicians